Joe Cecil "Red" Simpson (March 6, 1934 – January 8, 2016) was an American country music singer and songwriter best known for his trucker-themed country songs.

Biography
Joe Cecil Simpson was born in 1934 in Higley, Arizona, and was raised in Bakersfield, California, the youngest of 12 children. At age 14, he wrote his first song. However, his father helped him listen to Ludwig van Beethoven.

Simpson was working at the Wagon Wheel in Lamont when Fuzzy Owen saw him and arranged for Simpson to work at his Clover Club as a piano player. He then got a job replacing Buck Owens at the Blackboard Club on weekends. Simpson was influenced by Owens, Merle Haggard and Bill Woods, who asked Red if he would write a song about driving trucks. (By the time Simpson handed him four truck songs, however, Woods had stopped recording.) Simpson began writing songs with Owens in 1962, including the Top Ten hit "Gonna Have Love."

In 1965, Capitol Records producer Ken Nelson was looking for someone to record some songs about trucking. His first choice was Haggard, who wasn't interested, but Simpson readily agreed. His first, Tommy Collins' "Roll, Truck, Roll," became a Top 40 country hit and Simpson recorded an album of the same name. That year he offered up two more trucking songs, both of which made it to the Top 50 or beyond. As a songwriter, he scored his first number one hit with "Sam's Place," recorded by Buck Owens. After that, Simpson decided to become a full-time writer. He returned to performing in 1971 with his Top Five hit "I'm a Truck," which had been written by postman Bob Staunton.

In 1972, he debuted on the Grand Ole Opry and had two more "truck" hits for Capitol. In 1976, Simpson signed to Warner Brothers and released "Truck Driver's Heaven." The following year, he teamed up with Lorraine Walden for a series of duets that included "Truck Driver Man and Wife." In 1979, Simpson appeared for the last time on the charts with "The Flying Saucer Man and the Truck Driver." Haggard recorded his song "Lucky Old Colorado" in 1988. Later that year Simpson was diagnosed with skin cancer and underwent surgery. He fully recovered and continued his writing and performing career.

In the 1995, Red re-entered the studio to record a pair of duets with Junior Brown — "Semi Crazy" and "Nitro Express".

Simpson performed frequently in the Bakersfield area, including a regular Monday night gig at Trout's in Oildale. Simpson's most recent release is "Hey, Bin Laden". He was also working on a project with Windsor Music tentatively entitled The Bard of Bakersfield.

Simpson also appeared alongside Bakersfield business owner Gene Thome on his ode to Simpson, Haggard, and Owens "It's a Bakersfield Thing" released in early 2015.

Red Simpson died on January 8, 2016, at a hospital in Bakersfield, after suffering complications from a heart attack. He was 81.

Simpson was posthumously honored at the 2016 Ameripolitan awards. His son David Simpson accepted the "Founder of the Sound" award on his behalf.

Simpson completed his most recent album in December 2015 entitled Soda Pops and Saturdays with Mario Carboni. The album was recorded in Portland, Oregon, and featured 12 tracks. Simpson plays guitar and sings lead and backup vocals on this album. Carboni plays piano, strings, and backup vocals. The album was scheduled to be released on February 4, 2016; instead, it was released on January 9, 2016, after his death.

Discography

Albums

Singles

See also
Truck-driving country
Honky Tonk
Bakersfield Sound
Dick Curless

References

External links
Red Simpson Diesel Sniffin at WFMU
CMT Biography
Red Simpson article
Bakersfield

1934 births
2016 deaths
People from Maricopa County, Arizona
Musicians from Bakersfield, California
American country singer-songwriters
Capitol Records artists
Singer-songwriters from California
Country musicians from California
Country musicians from Arizona
Singer-songwriters from Arizona